Zambia Congress of Trade Unions (ZCTU) is the dominant central trade union federation in Zambia. 

It's vision is founded on the firm belief that trade union are indispensable partners in the industrial relations involving government, employers and labor and that the process of development culminates into equitable distribution of wealth among stakeholders. 

ZCTU was founded in 1964. The ZCTU was created by the government to replace the former United Trade Union Congress. It has 33 affiliated unions. It's vision is founded on the firm belief that trade union are indispensable partners in the industrial relations involving government, employers and labor and that the process of development culminates into equitable distribution of wealth among stakeholders. 

Frederick Chiluba was Chairman-General of ZCTU 1974-1991. From 1991 to 2002, the president was Fackson Shamenda. From October 2002 to 20 December 2014, the president was Leonard Choongo Hikaumba. From 2008 to 20 December 2014, the Secretary General was Roy Mwaba. Currently, the president is Nkole Chishimba while the Secretary General is Cosmas Mukuka.

The ZCTU is affiliated to the International Trade Union Confederation.

References

External links
 www.zctu.org.zm website.

National federations of trade unions
Trade unions in Zambia
International Trade Union Confederation
1964 establishments in Zambia
Trade unions established in 1964